Bellaetrix Manuputty (born 11 October 1988) is an Indonesian badminton player.

Career 
In 2014 Asian Games, Manuputty advanced to quarterfinals after a match against P. V. Sindhu.

Manuputty advanced to main stage of 2015 All England Super Series Premier after winning the qualification versus Kati Tolmoff and Milicent Wiranto in the first and second phase respectively.

Manuputty advanced to  the second round of 2015 Singapore Super Series, after she won the match against Yui Hashimoto. In the second round, Bellaetrix lost to Sun Yu.

In 2015 Sudirman Cup first round, Manuputty won against Line Kjaersfeldt. In the second round, she suffered knee injury in the match versus Li Xuerui. She was predicted absent for 3 months missing the SEA Games and 2015 Indonesia Super Series Premier. Manuputty stated that after further examination, her ACL muscle was torn about 20%.

2015 Chinese Taipei Masters Grand Prix was the first tournament Manuputty played after Sudirman Cup. She won the first round against Wendy Chen Hsuan-yu from Australia. In the second round, she had to stop in the first game versus Sung Shuo-yun due to relapsed knee injury she suffered in Sudirman Cup.

Achievements

Southeast Asian Games

World University Championships 
Women’s singles

Asian Junior Championships 
Girls' singles

BWF International Challenge/Series 

  BWF International Challenge tournament
  BWF International Series tournament

Performance timeline

Indonesian team 
 Junior level

 Senior level

Individual competitions 
 Junior level

 Senior level

References

External links 
 
 
 

1988 births
Living people
Sportspeople from Jakarta
Indonesian female badminton players
Badminton players at the 2014 Asian Games
Asian Games competitors for Indonesia
Competitors at the 2011 Southeast Asian Games
Competitors at the 2013 Southeast Asian Games
Southeast Asian Games gold medalists for Indonesia
Southeast Asian Games silver medalists for Indonesia
Southeast Asian Games medalists in badminton
Universiade gold medalists for Indonesia
Universiade medalists in badminton
Medalists at the 2011 Summer Universiade
Indonesian Christians
20th-century Indonesian women
21st-century Indonesian women